George Phillips Bevan (1829 – 1889) FSS FGS was a Welsh statistician, geographer and author, and the brother of William Latham Bevan.

His father was William Hibbs Bevan (1788-1846), who was high sheriff for Breconshire in 1841, and his brother, William Bevan, was archdeacon of Brecon from 1875. His mother Margaret, daughter of Joseph Latham, was also of Beaufort.

Bevan's Statistical Atlas (1882)
His Statistical Atlas was a massive tome with 45 plates, each 20×28 inches, and many statistical tables.

It provides a useful reference list of schools of the period.

The Educational Condition of the United Kingdom
These tables and map provide a useful reference to educational institutions of the 1880s, including statistical information about the following:
 Primitive Methodist
 York Jubilee School (Elmfield College)
 Birmingham Bourne College
 Moravian
Fulneck School
Gomersal School
Mirfield School
Wyke School

Publications
 1880 The strikes of the past ten years. Journal of the Statistical Society of London, 43(1), 35–64.
1880 Tourists' Guide to the West Riding of Yorkshire ... With ... Maps.
1882 The Statistical Atlas of England, Scotland and Ireland. Edinburgh & London: W. & A. K. Johnston

British Manufacturing Industries
Bevan edited a series of volumes consisting of papers on primary manufacturing and crafts in the UK. There were 15 volumes, published from 1876 to 1878.

References

External links
 
 

Welsh statisticians
Fellows of the Geological Society of London
Fellows of the Royal Statistical Society
1829 births
1889 deaths